Scott Carter Stewart (born November 2, 1999) is an American professional baseball pitcher for the Fukuoka SoftBank Hawks of Nippon Professional Baseball (NPB).

Early career
Stewart attended and graduated from Eau Gallie High School in Eau Gallie, Florida. As a junior in 2017, he went 11–2 with a 0.81 earned run average (ERA) and 104 strikeouts. During the summer of 2017, he played in the Perfect Game All-American Classic at Petco Park. As a senior in 2018, he was named the Gatorade Baseball Player of the Year for Florida after going 6–2 with a 0.91 ERA and 128 strikeouts. He committed to play college baseball at Mississippi State University.

Stewart was considered one of the top prospects for the 2018 Major League Baseball draft, and was drafted by the Atlanta Braves with the eighth overall pick. Due to a wrist injury, Atlanta offered a signing bonus below the full value of the draft slot, and Stewart did not sign with the Braves.

Stewart enrolled at Eastern Florida State College (EFSC) for the 2018–19 academic year in order to be eligible for selection in the 2019 Major League Baseball draft. With the EFSC Titans, who compete in the National Junior College Athletic Association (NJCAA), Stewart made 13 starts, compiling a 2–2 record with 1.70 ERA and 108 strikeouts.

Professional career

Fukuoka SoftBank Hawks
On May 21, 2019, sports website The Athletic reported that Stewart agreed to contract terms with the Fukuoka SoftBank Hawks of Nippon Professional Baseball (NPB). On May 30, the Hawks officially announced that Stewart had agreed and been signed to a six-year contract that guarantees him as much as $7 million.

In 2019-2020 season, Stewart pitched in the Western League of NPB's minor leagues and  pitched in informal matches against Shikoku Island League Plus's teams.

On April 17, 2021, Stewart made his NPB debut in the ninth inning of a game against the Saitama Seibu Lions. He struck out two batters, walked one, and his fastball was measured at 94 miles per hour.

In 2022 season, he didn't get a chance to pitch in the Pacific League and played in the Western League.

References

External links

ESFC Titans bio
Career statistics - NPB.jp
2 Carter Stewart, Jr. PLAYERS2022 - Fukuoka SoftBank Hawks Official site

1999 births
Living people
People from Melbourne, Florida
Baseball players from Florida
Eastern Florida State College people
American expatriate baseball players in Japan
Nippon Professional Baseball pitchers
Fukuoka SoftBank Hawks players